The Iraghi, also known as Khoi, Phartsun and Sekeed, is a traditional pillbox hat, originated and predominantly used in Gilgit-Baltistan, Pakistan. It is worn by women and features colourful embroidery of silk thread on which the designs represents wild animals, their paw prints, birds, leaves and body parts of insects. Silver jewellery, called Silsila, is also attached to its front. It takes around two months, working two to three hours a day, to prepare one such hat. The hat is worn for religious purpose and as a symbol of cultural identity.

Gallery

References

Hats
Pakistani headgear